Tools used in traditional timber framing date back thousands of years. Similar tools are used in many cultures, but the shapes vary and some are pulled rather than pushed.

Gallery

Preparing timbers
 Conversion of logs into timbers was often done by someone other than the timber framer including a lumberjack, sawyer, farmer, or laborer using a variety of tools including:
 Whipsaw types of rip saws used in the conversion of logs into timbers in a saw pit
 felling, carpenter's, and broad axes are used in hewing.
 Sawmill
 Wood splitting, also called riving uses wedges, splitting mauls, and/or froes.
 Historically most timbers were used green but some went through a process of wood drying using some tools and equipment.

Marking and measuring tools

Tools for marking out and measuring:
 A rule, now better known as a ruler and similar to a yard stick, is used to measure.
 Repeated measurements often use a storey pole
 Carpenter's marks were made with a race knife, chisel, gouge, saw, grease pencil, chalk pencil, or lead pencil.
 Chalk line or ink line used to snap lines on the wood. Ink and a slurry of charcoal were used like chalk.
 Carpenter pencil
 Scratch awl or similar tools were used to scratch lines on wood before the pencil was commonly used beginning in the 19th century in the U.S.
 Try square
 Steel square is also known as a framing square. Historically a square with measurement markings on it was known as a "square rule" which is also a layout method.
 Combination square
 A Plumb-bob on a string is sometimes used with a plumb-rule or plumb-square to measure vertical or horizontal and to transfer marks between timbers while scribing.
 Spirit level
 Dividers Used in measuring and proportioning
 Layout floor - a large, flat surface to mark lines and scribe timbers.

Hand powered cutting tools
 Saw
 Crosscut saws to cut timbers to length and in making joints.
 Japanese saws are special saws used in woodworking including timber framing
 Axes were sometimes used to cut timbers to length and in joinery. 
 Hatchet
 Adzes are of many shapes and names.
 Framing Chisels are heavy duty. In Western carpentry common sizes are 1 1/2 and 2 inches wide. They are designed to be struck with a mallet
 A slick is a very large chisel designed to be pushed by hand, not struck.
 drills for boring holes in timber framing were typically T-auger. The cutting edge of the bit can be of many shapes, the spiral auger being the standard shape since the 19th century.
 Timber framers boring machines were invented by 1830 and hold an auger bit. They made mortising easier and faster.
 Draw knives are used to chamfer edges of beams and shape pegs (treenails)
 Sometimes, particularly in wooden bridge building the pegs were shaped by being driven through a hole in a heavy piece metal.
 Historically timbers meant to be seen in houses were smoothed with a hand plane (Japanese plane including  what is called a spear plane, yariganna or yari-kanna) and decorated with a chamfer or bead. 
 Twybil The name literally "two blades", historically rare in the U.S.
 Bisaigue A French tool with similarities to a long handled twybill

Powered cutting tools
 Circular saw
 Drill
 Band saw
 Router (woodworking)
 Power planers
 One or two sided stationary rotary, thickness planers in a shop and up to a four-sided planer (timber sizer) at a mill. 
 Hand held rotary power planers up to twelve inches wide.
 Chain mortiser
 A few modern framers use computer numerical control (CNC) machines to cut joinery.
 Chain saw

Splitting tools
A Froe is struck with a mallet to split blocks of wood into rough sizes for making pegs.
Large and long timbers are split (riven) with wedges

Holding tools
 Shaving horse may be used in making pegs
Draw-bore pins temporarily hold a frame together during construction.
 Iron dogs or log dogs are used to hold timers during hewing, scribing or historically to repair or reinforce a joint
 Sawhorses, short sawhorses are called ponies.

Material handling tools and equipment
 Gin pole or shear legs may be used in lifting wall sections or timbers.
 Pike pole used to push wall sections up during a barn raising
 Rope is used to lift or pull objects, sometimes in combination with a windlass, bullwheel, or block and tackle.
 Cranes are sometimes used to lift assemblies and materials.
 Commander or beetel is a large, long handled mallet for forcing timbers together or apart.
 Rollers, carts, or other lifting equipment are used to move the heavy timbers

Tool maintenance
Tools require sharpening and replacing handles. 
 file (tool)
 sharpening stone
 Grindstone (tool)
 hiring a blacksmith
 mechanics tools for general repairs such as repairing power cords, changing bits, etc.

Access
 Ladder
 Scaffolding
 Aerial work platform

Safety
 Fall protection
 Hard hat
 Safety glasses
 Hearing protection
 First aid kit

External links
 The Takenaka Carpentry Tools Museum, Kobe, Japan
 The Debate of the Carpenter’s Tools, Edited by George Shuffelton. Originally Published in Codex Ashmole 61: A Compilation of Popular Middle English Verse

Woodworking tools
Timber framing